The 142nd Regiment, Illinois Volunteer Infantry was an infantry regiment that served in the Union Army during the American Civil War. It was among scores of regiments that were raised in the summer of 1864 as Hundred Days Men, an effort to augment existing manpower for an all-out push to end the war within 100 days.

Service
The 142nd Illinois organized at Freeport, Illinois, as an eight-company battalion. At Camp Butler, Illinois, two companies were added, and regiment was mustered into Federal service on June 18, 1864, for a one-hundred-day enlistment. The 142nd Illinois guarded the Memphis and Charleston Railroad in the vicinity of Memphis, Tennessee.

The regiment was mustered out of service on October 27, 1864, at Chicago, Illinois.

Total strength and casualties
The regiment suffered 30 enlisted men who died of disease, for a total of 30 fatalities.

Commanders
Colonel Rollin V. Ankeny - mustered out with the regiment.

See also
List of Illinois Civil War Units
Illinois in the American Civil War

Notes

References
The Civil War Archive

Units and formations of the Union Army from Illinois
Military units and formations established in 1864
1864 establishments in Illinois
Military units and formations disestablished in 1864